Yevgeni Stanislavovich Marichev (born 27 July 1995) is a Russian football player. He plays for FC Zorkiy Krasnogorsk.

Club career
He made his debut in the Russian Professional Football League for FC Ryazan on 2 September 2016 in a game against FC Energomash Belgorod.

He made his Russian Football National League debut for FC Tekstilshchik Ivanovo on 7 July 2019 in a game against FC Yenisey Krasnoyarsk.

References

External links
 Profile by Russian Professional Football League

1995 births
People from Fryazino
Sportspeople from Moscow Oblast
Living people
Russian footballers
Association football midfielders
FC Tekstilshchik Ivanovo players
FC Spartak Kostroma players
Russian First League players
Russian Second League players